Friedrich-Schmidt-Platz is a square in Vienna, Austria.

Squares in Vienna
Innere Stadt